Vishnu Dayal Ram is a former Director General Police of Jharkhand state in India. He is a 1973 batch IPS officer and had served as DGP of Jharkhand Police twice from 1 July 2005 to 27 September 2006 and from 4 August 2007 to 13 January 2010. He has earlier served as SP of Bhagalpur and SSP of Patna. After retirement, he joined Bharatiya Janata Party and won 2014 Lok Sabha election from Palamu (Lok Sabha constituency).

References

Living people
Indian police chiefs
India MPs 2014–2019
Lok Sabha members from Jharkhand
People from Palamu district
Bharatiya Janata Party politicians from Jharkhand
1951 births
India MPs 2019–present